Antropora is a genus of bryozoans belonging to the family Antroporidae.

The genus has almost cosmopolitan distribution.

Species

Species:

Antropora absidata 
Antropora acicularis 
†Antropora ampla 
†Antropora arborescens 
†Antropora biglobosa
Antropora commandorica 
Antropora compressa 
Antropora cruzeiro 
Antropora curvirostris 
†Antropora daishakaensis 
†Antropora duplex 
†Antropora elliptica 
†Antropora elongata 
Antropora erecta 
Antropora erectirostra 
Antropora fenglingiana 
†Antropora forata 
†Antropora gadhavii 
Antropora gemarita 
Antropora granulifera 
†Antropora guajirensis 
Antropora hastata 
†Antropora hataii 
†Antropora lecointrei 
Antropora levigata 
†Antropora lowei 
Antropora minor 
†Antropora minuta 
†Antropora navalis 
†Antropora octonaria 
†Antropora oculifera 
†Antropora ogivalis 
†Antropora parvicapitata 
Antropora paucicryptocysta 
†Antropora pyriformis 
†Antropora ramaniaensis
†Antropora striata 
Antropora subvespertilio 
†Antropora transversa 
Antropora typica

References

Bryozoan genera